Calliphora augur, known as the lesser brown blowfly or bluebodied blowfly, is a species of blow-fly that is native to Australia. It is similar to the eastern goldenhaired blowfly (common brown blowfly) but slightly smaller, and its abdomen has a central dark blue patch.

It is a common visitor to houses and is also noted as a perpetrator of flystrike on sheep. It lays living maggots (Viviparous), unlike most blow-fly species which lay eggs.

References

 Department of Primary Industries : Sheep blowflies of Victoria
CSIRO: Calliphora augur (Fabricius)

Calliphoridae
Insects of Australia
Insects described in 1775
Taxa named by Johan Christian Fabricius